R v Hape (2007) is a case on appeal to the Supreme Court of Canada on cross-border crime. An investment banker was convicted on money laundering. The investigation involved the search of his property in Turks and Caicos by the local police. He claimed his rights under section 8 of the Canadian Charter of Rights and Freedoms were violated by the search. The Supreme Court held that the evidence found in the search was admissible and that the Charter could not be binding on the local police.

External links
 
 Ontario Court of Appeal decision
 Ontario Superior Court decision

Section Eight Charter case law
Supreme Court of Canada cases
2006 in Canadian case law
Canadian criminal procedure case law